Wild elder is a common name for several plants and may refer to:

Plant species of the genus Sambucus
Nuxia floribunda,  a species of tree native to Africa